The S2 Mach II is a 350 cc Kawasaki motorcycle introduced for the 1972 model year and discontinued at the end of the 1974 model year.

References
 

Standard motorcycles
S2 Mach II
Motorcycles introduced in 1972
Two-stroke motorcycles